Satdobato Youth Club (formally known as Satdobato FC) is a Nepalese professional football club from Satdobato, Lalitpur. In 2021, the club was first promoted to play in Nepali top flight, the Martyr's Memorial A-Division League.

History 
The club was founded in 1998.

Current squad

League finishes 
The season-by-season performance of SYC:

Honours

National 
 Martyr's Memorial B-Division League:
 Champions: 2020–21
 Martyr's Memorial C-Division League:
 Champions: 2011

References 

Football clubs in Nepal
1998 establishments in Nepal